Stephens' gem or the bilobed looper (Megalographa biloba) is a moth of the family Noctuidae. It is widely distributed from the southern parts of the United States, south through Central America and South America to Argentina. As a seasonal migrant it occurs even farther north into the northern parts of the United States and southern Canada. Here it usually produces one or two generations each summer, but rarely survives the winter this far north. It also occurs in the Hawaiian Islands but it is unknown if the species occurs there naturally or was introduced. It has also been recorded in Great Britain, where it is either a rare migrant or introduced by travel on ships crossing the Atlantic.

The wingspan is 38–44 mm.

It is sometimes considered a pest on cultivated lettuce.

External links
 A review of the genus Megalographa Lafontaine and Poole (Lepidoptera: Noctuidae: Plusiinae) with the description of a new species from Costa Rica
 UKmoths

Plusiinae
Moths described in 1830
Moths of Europe
Moths of North America
Noctuidae of South America
Taxa named by James Francis Stephens